Hafiz Sohan Halwa is a Pakistani confectionery brand based in Multan, Pakistan, which makes Sohan halwa.

History 
The company was founded by Hafiz Habib ur Rahman in 1963. The halwa shop from where the business was launched dates back to 1945.

Products 
The company is described as a pioneer of Multan's halwa desserts, which are popular throughout Pakistan and exported internationally.

References

1963 establishments in Pakistan
Companies based in Multan
Food and drink companies established in 1963
Food manufacturers of Pakistan
Pakistani brands
Pakistani cuisine